Jack Black (1871–1932) was a hobo and professional burglar. Born in 1871 in New Westminster, British Columbia, he was raised from infancy in the U.S. state of Missouri in the town of Maysville and eventually Kansas City. He wrote You Can't Win (Macmillan, 1926), a memoir or sketched autobiography describing his days on the road and life as an outlaw. Black's book was written as an anti-crime book urging criminals to go straight, but it is also his statement of belief in the futility of prisons and the criminal justice system, hence the title of the book. Jack Black was writing from experience, having spent thirty years (fifteen of which were spent in various prisons) as a traveling criminal, and offers tales of being a cross-country stick-up man, home burglar, petty thief, and opium fiend. He gained fame as a prison reformer, writer and playwright. He disappeared in 1932 in a likely suicide.

Life
Jack Black is an essentially anonymous figure; even his actual name is uncertain. Some 1904 news articles name him as Jack Black, alias Tom Callahan, while a 1912 newspaper article names him Thomas Callaghan, alias Jack Black, and another gives his alias as Harry Klein. One of his nicknames among criminals was Blacky.

After his last spell in prison, Black became friends with wealthy patron Fremont Older and worked for Older's newspaper The San Francisco Call. He worked on his autobiography with Rose Wilder Lane and eventually composed essays and lectured throughout the country on prison reform. He was also rumored to have received a stipend of $150 a week to draft a screenplay titled Salt Chunk Mary with co-author Bessie Beatty, based around the infamous vagabond ally and fence of the same name in You Can't Win. The play flopped, although he was able to attain some amount of popularity, which subsided quickly.

His philosophy on life was especially influential to William S. Burroughs, Burroughs associated with similar characters in his early adulthood and mirrored the style of You Can't Win with his first published book, Junkie.

In his foreword to the 1988 edition of You Can't Win (reproduced in a 2000 edition), Burroughs wrote:

"I first read You Can't Win in 1926, in an edition bound in red cardboard. Stultified and confined by middle-class St. Louis mores, I was fascinated by this glimpse of an underworld of seedy rooming houses, pool parlors, cat houses and opium dens, of bull pens and cat burglars and hobo jungles. I learned about the Johnson Family of good bums and thieves, with a code of conduct that made more sense to me than the arbitrary, hypocritical rules that were taken for granted as being 'right' by my peers."

Disappearance
He disappeared in 1932 and is believed to have committed suicide by drowning, as he reportedly told his friends that if life got too grim, he would row out into New York Harbor and, with weights tied to his feet, drop overboard. In You Can't Win Black describes this state of mind as being "ready for the river".

Quoted excerpts about Black and his memoir

Bibliography
Black, Jack. You Can't Win. New York: Macmillan Company, 1926. Foreword by Robert Herrick. 
_. You Can't Win: the Autobiography of Jack Black. New York: Amok Press, 1988. Foreword by William S. Burroughs.  
_. Du kommst nicht durch. Berlin : Kramer, 1998.  
_. You Can't Win. 2nd edition. Edinburgh: AK Press/Nabat books, 2000.  
_. You Can't Win. [S.l.] : BN Publishing, 2007.

See also
List of people who disappeared

References

Cited sources

Further reading
 "Out of prison", San Francisco Bulletin, February/March 1917.
 "The big break at Folsom", San Francisco Bulletin, January 1917.
 Black, Jack "What's wrong with the right people?", Harper's Monthly Magazine, June 1929.
 Black, Jack "A burglar looks at laws and codes", Harper's Monthly Magazine, February 1930.
 "Jack Black's Tales of Jail Birds", New York World, December 21, 1930.
 Jamboree, with Jack Black and Bessie Beatty; Elizabeth Miele, producer, 1932.

External links
 
 San Francisco Call, Volume 111, Number 36, 5 January 1912

1871 births
1930s missing person cases
1932 deaths
American autobiographers
American male non-fiction writers
20th-century American memoirists
American people convicted of burglary
Canadian autobiographers
Canadian male non-fiction writers
Canadian memoirists
Hoboes
Missing person cases in California
1932 suicides